Timothy J. "TJ" White is a United States Navy vice admiral who served as commander of the United States Fleet Cyber Command and United States Tenth Fleet from 2018 to 2020.

References

United States Navy personnel of the Gulf War
Living people
National Defense University alumni
Naval Postgraduate School alumni
Place of birth missing (living people)
Recipients of the Defense Superior Service Medal
Recipients of the Legion of Merit
United States Naval Academy alumni
Year of birth missing (living people)